Kesholohetse Glenda Lepolesa is a South African politician. A member of the Economic Freedom Fighters (EFF), she is a representative of the party in the Northern Cape Provincial Legislature. She is the deputy provincial secretary of the EFF.

References

External links
Profile : Ms Kesholohetse Glenda Lepolesa – NCPLEG
Kesholohetse Glenda Lepolesa – People's Assembly

Living people
Economic Freedom Fighters politicians
Members of the Northern Cape Provincial Legislature
People from the Northern Cape
Women members of provincial legislatures of South Africa
Year of birth missing (living people)